Peter Kasowski (born March 19, 1969) is a Canadian former ice hockey and roller hockey player. He was drafted by the Hartford Whalers of the NHL in 1989.

Junior career
Kasowski played in the WHL for 3 years for Swift Current Broncos and Seattle Thunderbirds. Over these 3 years he scored 324 points in 212 games. His best season being 1988–89 when he scored 131 points in 72 games, he was subsequently drafted by the NHL's Hartford Whalers in the 12th round.

Professional ice hockey career
Kasowski finished his junior career and was signed by Roanoake Valley Rebels of the ECHL where he spent 2 successful years scoring 54 and 76 points in each of the 36 game seasons. During the 1991–92 season, he was signed to play for the Salt Lake Golden Eagles of the IHL where he made 9 appearances. The 1992–93 season was split between Dayton Bombers of the ECHL where he scored 57 points in 51 games, Peoria Rivermen of the IHL where he contributed 5 goals and 5 assists in 22 games.

1994–1996: Roller hockey
Through the 1994, 1995 and 1996 seasons Kasowski spent his time playing the RHI roller hockey league. He played for Edmonton Sled Dogs and latterly Los Angeles Blades. He scored 39 goals, 48 assists for 87 points in 68 career games.

Ice hockey career: continued
In 1997, Kasowski signed to play in Britain for Guildford Flames in the BNL. He finished the season as the team's second-top scorer with 91 points in 44 games. His two subsequent seasons with the Flames were less productive, but effective all the same, scoring 46 and 53 points in 1998/99 and 99/00 respectively. He was not re-signed in 2000 and has not played since. He still remains in the top scorers of All Time for the Flames.

Career statistics

External links
 

1969 births
Living people
Canadian expatriate ice hockey players in England
Canadian expatriate ice hockey players in the United States
Canadian people of Polish descent
Dayton Bombers players
Edmonton Sled Dogs players
Guildford Flames players
Hartford Whalers draft picks
Los Angeles Blades players
Peoria Rivermen (IHL) players
Roanoke Express players
Salt Lake Golden Eagles (IHL) players
Seattle Thunderbirds players
Ice hockey people from Edmonton
Swift Current Broncos players